Kastuļina Parish is an administrative unit of Krāslava Municipality. From 2009 until 2021, it was part of the former Aglona Municipality.

Towns, villages and settlements of Kastuļina parish

References

Parishes of Latvia
Krāslava Municipality
Latgale